The 1996 Toshiba Classic was a women's tennis tournament played on outdoor hard courts at the La Costa Resort and Spa in San Diego, California in the United States that was part of Tier II of the 1996 WTA Tour. The tournament was held from August 19 through August 25, 1996. Fourth-seeded Kimiko Date won the singles title.

Finals

Singles

 Kimiko Date defeated  Arantxa Sánchez Vicario 3–6, 6–3, 6–0
 It was Date's 3rd title of the year and the 8th of her career.

Doubles

 Gigi Fernández /  Conchita Martínez defeated  Larisa Savchenko /  Arantxa Sánchez Vicario 4–6, 6–3, 6–4
 It was Fernández's 3rd title of the year and the 66th of her career. It was Martínez's 2nd title of the year and the 32nd of her career.

References

External links
 ITF tournament edition details
 Tournament draws

Toshiba Classic
Southern California Open
Toshiba Classic
1996 in American tennis